This is a list of ballparks used for professional baseball in the five boroughs of New York City. The information is a compilation of the information contained in the references listed.

Brooklyn 

York Street Park
Home of: Atlantics – amateur (ca. 1855–1865)
Location: Brooklyn – York Street
Currently: approach ramps for Brooklyn Bridge

Excelsior grounds (I)
Home of: Excelsior – amateur (1854-1859)
Location: Carroll Gardens, Brooklyn
Currently: residential

Excelsior grounds (II)
Home of: Excelsior – am/pro independent (1859–1870)
Location: Red Hook, Brooklyn – south end of Court Street, on the waterfront (Gowanus Canal)
Currently: industrial

Union Grounds
Home of:
Eckford – independent am/pro (1862–1871), NA (1872)
Mutual – independent am/pro (1868–1870), NA (1871-75), NL (1876)
Atlantic – NA (1873–1875)
"Hartford of Brooklyn" – NL (1877)
several single-game "home" games by other clubs
Location: Williamsburg, Brooklyn – Marcy Avenue (southwest, center field); Rutledge Street (northwest, right field); Harrison Avenue (northeast, home plate); Lynch Street (southeast, left field)
Currently: National Guard building, Juan Morel Campos Secondary School

Capitoline Grounds
Home of:
Atlantic – am/pro independent (1864 or 1865 – 1871), NA (1872)
Excelsior – am/pro independent (1866–1871)
Enterprise – am independent (ca. 1864–1866)
Location: Bedford, Brooklyn – Marcy Avenue (east); Halsey Street (south); Putnam Avenue (north); Nostrand Avenue (west)
– less than 1.5 miles south of Union Grounds along Marcy 
Currently: Residential

Washington Park I
Home of: Brooklyn Atlantics/Bridegrooms/Trolley Dodgers – Inter-State League (1883), AA (1884–1889), NL (1890–1891 part)
Also used as a neutral site for two games in the 1887 World Series and one game in the 1888 World Series
Location: Park Slope, Brooklyn – 3rd Street (north, right field) and 5th Street (south, left field); 4th Avenue (west, center field) and 5th Avenue (east, home plate)
Currently: Residential, school, public park, and Gowanus House

Eastern Park
Home of: 
Brooklyn Ward's Wonders – PL (1890)
Brooklyn Dodgers (1891 part – 1897)
Location: Brownsville, Brooklyn – Eastern Parkway (segment later renamed Pitkin Avenue when Eastern was diverted) (north, home plate); Long Island Railroad and Vesta Avenue (later renamed Van Sinderen Street) (east, left field); Sutter Avenue (south, center field); Powell Street (west, right field)
Currently: Commercial / industrial

Washington Park II
Home of:
Brooklyn Dodgers/Superbas – NL (1898–1912)
Brooklyn Tip-Tops – FL (1914–1915)
Location: Park Slope, Brooklyn – diagonally across from the northwest corner of the previous Washington Park: 1st Street (north, right field) and 3rd Street (south, third base); 3rd Avenue (west, left field) and 4th Avenue (east, first base)
Currently: Consolidated Edison – part of ballpark wall still stands

Ebbets Field
Home of: Brooklyn Dodgers – NL (1913–1957)
Location: Brooklyn – formerly within Flatbush, now considered part of Crown Heights – 55 Sullivan Place – Bedford Avenue (east, right field); Sullivan Place (south, first base); McKeever Place (originally Cedar Place) (west, third base); Montgomery Street (north, left field)
Currently: Jackie Robinson Apartments

Maimonides Park prev. Key Span Park, MCU Park
Home of: Brooklyn Cyclones – New York–Penn League (2001–present)
Location: Coney Island site, Brooklyn – 1904 Surf Avenue – Surf Avenue (north, third base); Kensington Walk (east, left field); Boardwalk (south, right field); West 19th Street (west, first base)

Manhattan 

Polo Grounds (I) 
Home of:
Metropolitan – independent (1880–1882), AA (1883–1885)
New York Giants – NL (1883-1888)
Also used as a neutral site for one game in the 1887 World Series
Location: 110th Street (south, first base for Mets, third base for Giants); Fifth Avenue (east, first base for Giants); Sixth Avenue (renamed Lenox Avenue and since double-named as Malcolm X Boulevard) (west, third base for Mets); 112th Street (north, left field for Mets, right field for Giants)
Currently: Commercial and residential buildings, Harlem Academy

Metropolitan Park
Home of: Metropolitan – AA (1884 first part of season)
Location: Manhattan – 109th Street (north); Harlem River (east); 107th Street (south);  First Avenue (west)
Currently: Residential, commercial, public school

Manhattan Field aka Polo Grounds (II)
Home of: New York Giants (1889 part – 1890)
Location: 155th Street (south, third base); Eighth Avenue (east, first base) – next to site of Polo Grounds
Currently: Apartment buildings

Polo Grounds (III) / (IV) orig. Brotherhood Park 
Home of:
New York Giants – PL (1890)
New York Giants – NL (1891–1957)
New York Yankees – AL (1913–1922)
New York Mets – NL (1962–1963)
Location: Harlem River Drive aka Speedway (west, home plate); site of Manhattan Field and 155th Street viaduct (south, right field); 8th Avenue (east, center field); rail yards and later public housing (north, left field)
Currently: Apartment buildings

Olympia Field
Home of: local ball clubs (about 1901–1904)
Location: between 135th and 136th Streets, and Lenox Avenue (a.k.a. Malcolm X Boulevard), based on contemporary newspaper articles
Currently: Harlem Hospital Center, fire station, elementary school, and Howard Bennett Playground

Olympic Field
Home of: local ball clubs starting 1904; Lincoln Giants – independent (1911–1919)
Location: 136th Street, Fifth Avenue, and Madison Avenue, based on contemporary newspaper articles
Currently: medical buildings

Dyckman Oval
Home of:
Cuban Stars (East) – independent 1916–1922 / Eastern Colored League 1923–1928 / American Negro League 1929 only / independent 1930–1933
also various neutral-site games by other Negro league clubs
Location: Inwood section of Manhattan. Roughly triangular block bounded by Nagle Avenue and elevated tracks (northwest, third base); 204th Street (northeast, left field); 10th Avenue (southeast, right field); and Academy Street (southwest, first base). Existed from about 1915 through 1937.
Currently: NYCHA apartment buildings and Monsignor Kett Playground.

Hilltop Park formally American League Park
Home of:
New York Yankees – AL (1903–1912)
New York Giants – NL (1911 part)
Location: Washington Heights, Manhattan – Broadway (southeast, right field); West 165th Street (southwest, first base); Fort Washington Avenue (west, third base); 168th Street (northeast, left field)
Currently: NewYork–Presbyterian Hospital and other medical buildings

Bronx 

Bronx Oval 
Home of: New York Knickerbockers – United States Baseball League (1912 only)
Used for independent baseball and other sports as early as 1905, per local newspaper accounts.
Location: Bronx – 163rd Street and Southern Boulevard, as well as Hunt's Point Road
Currently: Commercial businesses

Catholic Protectory Oval or Catholic Protectory Field
Home of: Lincoln Giants – independent (1920–1922) / Eastern Colored League (1923–1928) / American Negro League (1929 only)
Location: part of the campus of the New York Catholic Protectory, which was southeast of East Tremont Avenue and Unionport Road; the ballpark site is close to where Unionport intersects with Metropolitan Avenue
Currently: Parkchester

Yankee Stadium (I) 
Home of: New York Yankees – AL (1923–1973, 1976–2008)
Location: Bronx – East 161st Street (north, left field); River Avenue (east, right field); 157th Street (south, first base); Macombs Dam Park (west, third base)
Currently: Macombs Dam Park, Heritage Field

Yankee Stadium (II)
Home of: New York Yankees – AL (2009–present)
Location: Bronx – across the street to the north from the old Yankee Stadium – East 161st Street (south, first base); River Avenue (east, right field); Macombs Dam Bridge / Jerome Avenue (west, third base); East 164th Street (north, left field)

Queens 

Fashion Race Course originally National Race Course
Home of: Operated as a horse race track 1853 to about 1869. Site of an intra-city all-star game series in 1858 on July 20, August 17 and September 10; notable as first admission charges for baseball.
Location: gate at what is now 37th Avenue and 103rd Street in Corona, Queens, New York about a mile west-southwest of Citi Field.

Grauer’s Ridgewood Park
Home of: Brooklyn Bridegrooms/Trolley Dodgers AA (1886 Sundays only)
Location: part of a large park bounded by Myrtle Avenue (north); Seneca Avenue (northeast); Decatur Street (southeast); Cypress Avenue (southwest)
Currently: commercial / residential

Wallace’s Ridgewood Park
Home of:
Brooklyn Bridegrooms/Trolley Dodgers AA (1887–1889 Sundays only)
Brooklyn Gladiators AA (1890)
Location: Long Island Railroad tracks & Wyckoff Avenue (northeast, right field); Covert Street (southeast, first base); Irving Avenue (southwest, third base); Halsey Street (northwest, left field) – a few blocks south of Grauer's Ridgewood Park
Currently: commercial

Long Island Grounds
Home of: Brooklyn Gladiators AA (1890 – 2 Sunday games)
Location: (Maspeth, New York) Grand Avenue (south); 57th Street (east)
Currently: industrial

Meyerrose Park
Home of: Brooklyn – Atlantic League (1907) / Union League (1908)
Location: Cornelia Street & Woodward Avenue
Currently: commercial

Dexter Park
Home of: Brooklyn Royal Giants – Negro leagues (1920s-1930s)
Location: Woodhaven, Queens – Jamaica Avenue (south); Eldert Lane T's into Jamaica from the south
Currently: residential

Shea Stadium
Home of:
New York Mets – NL (1964–2008)
New York Yankees – AL (1974-75)
Location: Flushing, Queens – 123-01 Roosevelt Avenue – 126th Street (northeast, right field); Roosevelt Avenue (southeast, first base); Shea Road (southwest/northwest, third base/left field)
Currently: Parking lot for Citi Field

The Ballpark at St. John's now known as Jack Kaiser Stadium
Home of: Brooklyn Cyclones – New York–Penn League (2000)
Location: Jamaica, Queens – St. John's University campus – Utopia Parkway (east, outfield); 175th Street (west/south, home plate/first base); Belson Stadium soccer field and Union Turnpike (northwest, third base)

Citi Field
Home of: New York Mets – NL (2009–present)
Location: Flushing, Queens – just east of Shea Stadium site – 126th Street (northeast, right field); Roosevelt Avenue (southeast, first base); Shea Road (southwest/northwest, third base/left field)

Staten Island 

St. George Grounds 
Home of:
Metropolitan – AA (1886–1887)
New York Giants – NL (1889) partial season
Location: St. George, Staten Island, Staten Island
Currently: Near site of Richmond County Bank Ballpark

Richmond County Bank Ballpark
Home of: Staten Island Yankees – New York–Penn League (2001–2020), Staten Island FerryHawks - Atlantic League (2021–present)
Location: St. George, Staten Island – Richmond Terrace (southwest, home plate/third base); Bank Street (southeast/northeast, first base/right field); Upper New York Bay, beyond Bank Street

See also
Lists of baseball parks

References

Peter Filichia, Professional Baseball Franchises, Facts on File, 1993.

Baseball Memories, by Marc Okkonen, Sterling Publishing, 1992.

External links
Photos and other info on Brooklyn ballparks
Dyckman Oval
Olympic Field vs. Olympia Field

New York City
baseball parks